Heinrich Lebensaft (22 March 1905 – 25 December 1991) was an Austrian footballer. He played in six matches for the Austria national football team from 1924 to 1927.

References

External links
 

1905 births
1991 deaths
Austrian footballers
Austria international footballers
Place of birth missing
Association footballers not categorized by position